This list of national postal services shows the individual national postal administrations of the world's states.

Africa

The Americas

Asia

Europe

Oceania

See also
List of postal entities

Postal national services